A compact intracloud discharge (CID), also known as a narrow bipolar event (NBE) or narrow bipolar pulse (NBP) is an intensive form of lightning that produces radio waves and scarce visible light. Lasting only a few millionths of a second (typically 20 us), these events are the most powerful known natural terrestrial source of radio waves in HF and VHF band. They are not well understood scientifically.

See also 
 Whistler (radio)

Lightning
Electrical phenomena

References